Borge may refer to:

Places

Antarctica
Borge Bay, small bay on the east side of Signy Island, in the South Orkney Islands
Borge Point, headland forming the east side of Mikkelsen Harbor, Trinity Island, in the Palmer Archipelago

Norway
Borge, Østfold, former municipality in Østfold
Borge, Nordland, former municipality in Nordland
Borge Church, parish church in Vestvågøy, Nordland county

Spain
El Borge, town and municipality in the province of Málaga

People

Surname
Borge (surname)

Given name
Børge, including a list of people so named

See also
Börger
Borges (disambiguation)
Borger (disambiguation)
Borgue (disambiguation)